Oyedaea is a genus of South American flowering plants in the tribe Heliantheae within the family Asteraceae.

 Species

 formerly included
see Bahiopsis Dimerostemma Gochnatia Lundellianthus Otopappus Perymeniopsis Steiractinia Stomatanthes Viguiera Zyzyxia

References

Heliantheae
Asteraceae genera
Flora of South America